Kouritenga (sometimes spelt Kourittenga) is one of the 45 provinces of Burkina Faso, located in its Centre-Est Region. In 2019 the province had a population of 479,930. Its capital is Koupéla.

Departments
Kouritenga is divided into 9 departments:

Demographics

See also
Regions of Burkina Faso
Provinces of Burkina Faso
Departments of Burkina Faso

References

 
Provinces of Burkina Faso